Frederick  Graf (August 25, 1889 – October 4, 1979) was a Major League Baseball third baseman who played with the St. Louis Browns in . In nine plate appearances he batted .400/.625/.600.

He was a minor league manager in the Southeastern League in 1926 and 1927. He was Jewish.

References

External links

1889 births
1979 deaths
Major League Baseball third basemen
Baseball players from Canton, Ohio
St. Louis Browns players
Wheeling Stogies players
Steubenville Stubs players
Richmond Colts players
Chattanooga Lookouts players
Chattanooga Lookouts managers
Atlanta Crackers players
Little Rock Travelers players
Nashville Vols players
Wichita Izzies players
Jewish American baseball players
Jewish Major League Baseball players